Bauernfrühstück is a warm German dish made from fried potatoes, eggs, green onions, parsley, cheese, and bacon or ham. Despite its name, it is eaten not only for breakfast but also for lunch and dinner.

Typical preparation
It is similar to the somewhat simpler English bubble and squeak. The ingredients are mixed in a pan and fried as an omelette. It is usually accompanied by a green or tomato salad or gherkins, and rye bread.

Similar dishes 
Similar dishes are found in other countries, too. In France, for example, as omelette à la paysanne (with sorrel), in Spain as a tortilla de patatas or in Sweden as pyttipanna.

 Hoppel poppel associated with the cuisine of Minnesota in the Midwestern United States.
 Rumbledethumps, stovies and clapshot from Scotland.
 Bubble and squeak, from England.
 Pyttipanna, Pyttipanne & Pyttipannu - Swedish, Norwegian and Finnish "small pieces in pan".
 Biksemad, from Denmark.
 Trinxat, from the Empordà region of Catalonia, northeast Spain, and Andorra
 Roupa Velha (Portuguese for "old clothes"), from Portugal, often made from leftovers from Cozido à Portuguesa. In Spain it is called Ropa Vieja and is made from the remains of the Cocido.
 Stemmelkort, another dish from Germany.
 Stamppot, from the Netherlands.
 Stoemp from Belgium.
 Hash, from the United States.
 Calentado, from Colombia.
 Also, see hash browns and potato cake entries.

Further reading

Erhard Gorys: The new kitchen lexicon. Of Aachener Printen to intermediate rib (dtv, No. 36245). 11th Edition, updated edition. German paperback publishing house, Munich 2007, .
Richard Herring, Jürgen F. Herrmann (Edit / Edit..): Herring Encyclopedia of Kitchen 23, expanded edition. Fachbuchverlag Pfannenberg, Haan-Gruiten 2001,  .

German cuisine
Cuisine of Wisconsin
Potato dishes
Bacon dishes
Ham dishes
Breakfast dishes